Each "article" in this category is in fact a collection of entries about several stamp issuers, presented in alphabetical order. The entries themselves are formulated on the micro model and so provide summary information about all known issuers.  

See the :Category:Compendium of postage stamp issuers page for details of the project.

Qatar 

Qatar had special treaty relations with Great Britain from 1916 until 3 September 1971, when it became an independent state.  British Agency general issues were used at Doha from August 1950 and at Umm Said from
February 1956.  On 1 April 1957, the agencies issued GB stamps overprinted QATAR.  The agencies closed on
23 May 1963 when Qatar began its own service.

Dates 	1957 –
Capital 	Doha
Currency 	(1957) 100 naye paise = 1 rupee
		(1966) 100 dirhams = 1 riyal

Main Article Needed 

See also 	British Postal Agencies in Eastern Arabia

Qishn & Socotra 

Refer 	Mahra Sultanate of Qishn & Socotra

Qu'Aiti State in Hadhramaut 

Dates 	1955 – 1967
Capital 	Mukalla
Currency 	(1955) 100 cents = 1 shilling
		(1966) 1000 fils = 1 dinar

Refer 	Aden Protectorate States

Qu'Aiti State of Shihr & Mukalla 

Dates 	1942 – 1955
Capital 	Mukalla
Currency 	(1942) 16 annas = 1 rupee
		(1951) 100 cents = 1 shilling

Refer 	Aden Protectorate States

Queen Maud Land 

Refer 	Norwegian Dependency

Queensland 

Dates 	1860 – 1913
Capital 	Brisbane
Currency 	12 pence = 1 shilling; 20 shillings = 1 pound

Main Article Needed 

See also 	Australia

Quelimane 

Dates 	1913 – 1920
Capital 	Quelimane
Currency 	100 centavos = 1 escudo

Refer 	Mozambique Territories

References

Bibliography
 Stanley Gibbons Ltd, Europe and Colonies 1970, Stanley Gibbons Ltd, 1969
 Stanley Gibbons Ltd, various catalogues
 Stuart Rossiter & John Flower, The Stamp Atlas, W H Smith, 1989
 XLCR Stamp Finder and Collector's Dictionary, Thomas Cliffe Ltd, c.1960

External links
 AskPhil – Glossary of Stamp Collecting Terms
 Encyclopaedia of Postal History

Qa